The  was a cadet branch of the Fujiwara clan. It was founded by Fujiwara no Muchimaro. Muchimaro had three brothers: Fusasaki, Maro and Umakai. These four brothers are known for having established the "four houses" of the Fujiwara.

The name Nanke ("southern house") comes from the fact that Muchimaro's mansion was located south of the mansion of his younger brother. The Nanke served in the imperial court, but many of Fujiwara no Tamenori's descendants later became samurai families such as Itō, Nikaidō, Sagara and Kudō.

Nara period 
The founder of Fujiwara Nanke, Fujiwara no Muchimaro, was the eldest son of Fujiwara no Fuhito. Shortly after the beginning of Nara period, Muchimaro became the head of Ministry of Civil Services in 718. When Fuhito died in 720, Prince Nagaya was at the highest rank in the state government. Prince Nagaya was grandson of Emperor Tenmu, but not a son of Fujiwara family, he was therefore seen as a threat by Muchimaro and his three brothers. After successfully removing Prince Nagaya in 729, Muchimaro rose to Dainagon, "Counselor of the first rank". In 734, he was promoted to Udaijin or "Minister of the Right", and in 737, he was made Sadaijin or "Minister of the Left".

Nanke further prospered in the Nara period as Nakamaro, the second son of Muchimaro, gained the trust of Empress Kōken and was given the name Emi no Oshikatsu.

Tachibana no Naramaro, who was unhappy about Nakamaro's monopolization of power, plotted a conspiracy to replace Nakamaro and to overthrow the Empress, but Nakamaro settled the rebellion and established dictatorship. However, Nakamaro was killed during Fujiwara no Nakamaro Rebellion after he attempted to overthrow the Imperial Family and become the emperor, after which Hokke replaced Nanke as the leading house of Fujiwara.

Notable members 

 Fujiwara no Muchimaro
 Fujiwara no Nakamaro
 Fujiwara no Suenori
 Fujiwara no Toshiyuki
 Ukon
 Fujiwara no Michinori

Family tree

See also
 Hokke (Fujiwara)
 Shikike
 Kyōke

Notes

References
 Brinkley, Frank and Dairoku Kikuchi. (1915). A History of the Japanese People from the Earliest Times to the End of the Meiji Era. New York: Encyclopædia Britannica. OCLC 413099
 Nussbaum, Louis-Frédéric and Käthe Roth. (2005). Japan Encyclopedia. Cambridge: Harvard University Press. ;  OCLC 58053128

Fujiwara clan
Japanese clans
Japanese nobility